Hoeneodes sinensis is a species of snout moth in the genus Hoeneodes. It was described by Aristide Caradja and Edward Meyrick in 1937. It is found in China.

References

Moths described in 1937
Phycitinae
Taxa named by Aristide Caradja